Anton Rosen (13 September 1859 – 2 July 1928) was a Danish architect, furniture designer, decorative artist and professor at the Royal Danish Academy of Fine Arts. In his architecture, he combined a free Historicist style with inspiration from contemporary English architecture and details influenced by Jugendstil.

Biography
Anton Rosen was born at Horsens in Jutland, Denmark. He was the son of Carl Julius Rose, master mason at the Royal Danish Theatre. The family moved to Copenhagen  where he attended the Copenhagen Technical College. In 1877,  Rosen was accepted into the Royal Danish Academy of Fine Arts . After graduating in 1882 he was employed with Vilhelm Dahlerup and in 1883 moved to Silkeborg to oversee the construction of Silkeborg Bath. In 1889 Rosen was married to the daughter of a local hotel owner, which gave him a personal attachment to Silkeborg which was to last and over the years he left a considerable mark on the cityscape of the young town with buildings such as Silkeborg Watertower and the chimney at Silkeborg Paperworks. The time with Vilhelm Dahlerup, until 1884 and again from 1890 to 1896, had great influence on his later works.

Rosen participated in many of the large exhibitions which were popular around the turn of the century, including as the main architect of the Danish National Exhibition of 1909 at Århus. The success with the latter made him a titular professor at the Academy of Fine Arts and won him its gold medal as well as the Eckersberg Medal, with support from Hack Kampmann and Heinrich Wenck among others.

Selected buildings
 Silkeborg Watertower, Silkeborg (19+2)
 Løvenborg, Vesterbrogade 34, Copenhagen (1906)
 Vesterbrogade 40-42, Copenhagen (1909)
 Palace Hotel, Copenhagen (1907–10)
 Ole Rømer Observatory, Århus (1910–11)
 Tuborg Factories, Hellerup (1912–14)

Gallery

Awards and distinctions
 1909 Eckersberg Medal
 1923 Knight of the Order of Danneborg
 1923 Officer of the Order of the Polar Star
 1924 Officer of the Order of Polonia Restituta
 1925 Dannebrogordenens Hæderstegn
 1925 Knight's Cross of the Légion d'honneur
 1927 Honorary member of Akademisk Arkitektforening

See also

 Architecture of Denmark

References

1859 births
1928 deaths
People from Horsens 
Royal Danish Academy of Fine Arts alumni
Directors of the Royal Danish Academy of Fine Arts
Danish architects
Art Nouveau architects
Recipients of the Eckersberg Medal